The 2022 Maricopa County Attorney special election took place on November 8, 2022, to elect the County Attorney for Maricopa County, Arizona. The election was held concurrently with other federal and state elections, as well as a special election for District 2 on the Maricopa County Board of Supervisors. The special election was called due to the resignation of Allister Adel in March 2022.

The primary occurred on August 2, 2022. The general election occurred on November 8, 2022. Incumbent Rachel Mitchell defeated 2020 nominee Julie Gunnigle with 52.8% of the vote.

Background
The office of Maricopa County Attorney has undergone leadership turmoil since the election of Andrew Thomas in 2004.  Thomas resigned in 2010 amid controversy eventually leading to his disbarment.  Bill Montgomery then defeated former County Attorney Rick Romley in the 2010 special election.  After Montgomery was controversially appointed to the Arizona Supreme Court, Allister Adel was appointed County Attorney in 2019. She was elected to a full term in 2020, defeating Democrat Julie Gunnigle with 46.45% of the vote. Adel announced her resignation in March 2022 amidst numerous controversies.

On April 20, 2022, the Maricopa County Board of Supervisors appointed Rachel Mitchell as the interim county attorney.

The timing of Adel's resignation was significant. If Adel had resigned two weeks later, the appointed interim attorney would have served until the 2024 election.  Candidates had just 13 days to meet the qualification deadline by gathering and submitting approximately 4,000 valid signatures by April 4.

Republican primary

Nominee
Rachel Mitchell, appointed incumbent

Eliminated in primary
Gina Godbehere, Goodyear city prosecutor

Withdrew
Anni Foster, general counsel to Governor Doug Ducey
James Austin Woods, attorney and son of former Arizona Attorney General Grant Woods

Results

Democratic primary

Nominee
Julie Gunnigle, legal director for Poor People's Campaign Arizona and nominee in 2020

Results

General election

References

External links
Official campaign websites
Rachel Mitchell (R) for County Attorney
Gina Godbehere (R) for County Attorney
Julie Gunnigle (D) for County Attorney

2022 Arizona elections
2022 United States local elections
Arizona special elections